Australasian Ornithological Conference is a biennial meeting of ornithologists that focuses on the Australasian region and Antarctica.  Preceded by the short-lived series of two Southern Hemisphere Ornithological Congresses, they were initiated by the Royal Australasian Ornithologists Union (RAOU), also known as Birds Australia, with the inaugural meeting held at Bathurst, New South Wales in 2001.  They have subsequently been jointly sponsored by the BirdLife Australia and the Ornithological Society of New Zealand (OSNZ).

Conferences
 2001 - Bathurst, New South Wales
 2003 - Canberra, Australian Capital Territory
 2005 - Blenheim, New Zealand
 2007 - Perth, Western Australia
 2009 - Armidale, New South Wales
 2011 - Cairns, Queensland
 2013 - Auckland, New Zealand
 2015 - Adelaide, South Australia
 2017 - Geelong, Victoria
 2019 - Darwin, Northern Territory

References

 Robin, Libby. (2001). Flight of the Emu: one hundred years of Australian ornithology. Melbourne University Press: Melbourne.

External links
 Birds Australia: AOC
 AOC Darwin 2019: AOC2019

Ornithological organisations in Australia
2001 establishments in Australia
Ornithological conferences